(born Osaka, 16 July 1976) is a Japanese former rugby union player who played as prop.

Career
After graduating from high school in 1995, Toyoyama joined Osaka University of Health and Sport Sciences' rugby club, with which he played in the All-Japan University Rugby Championship. In 1999, he graduated from university and joined Toyota Motors club. He first played for Japan against Fiji, in Tokyo, on 20 May 2000. He was also present in the 2003 Rugby World Cup squad coached by Shogo Mukai, playing three pool stage matches in the tournament. His final cap for Japan was against United States, in Gosford, on 27 October 2003, earning 24 caps, 15 points and 3 tries scored in aggregate. In 2008, Toyoyama left Toyota Verblitz, retiring as player. In 2013, he was appointed as coach by his former club, Toyota Verblitz and served for two seasons.
Toyoyama also played for Japan A in 2001, against a New Zealand Universities XV.

Notes

External links
Masahiko Toyoyama international stats

1976 births
Living people
Japanese rugby union players
Japanese rugby union coaches
Rugby union props
Japan international rugby union players
Toyota Verblitz players